Zapotin is a natural chemical compound, classified as a flavone, isolated from White sapote (Casimiroa edulis).

Several recent in vitro studies have shown that zapotin has potential anti-carcinogenic effects against isolated colon cancer cells.

References 

O-methylated flavones
Flavonoids found in Rutaceae